James Compton (born 1 December 1959 in North Tawton, Devon, England) is a British musician, composer, arranger, multi-instrumentalist and actor.

Biography
Compton moved to London in 1980 and joined his first professional band, Darts, on his 21st birthday. Three years later the entire band was cast in Yakety Yak, a musical featuring the songs of Leiber and Stoller. The band split in 1986. Later that year he joined Microdisney, an Irish indie band, going on to contribute to three singles and five albums.

Throughout his career, Compton has produced six albums and co-produced ten singles.

In 1990 he returned to the stage and went on to become musical supervisor of sixteen more musicals, eight of which had successful West End runs. Compton was responsible for all the music and soundscapes in Morecambe (a tribute to the British comedian Eric Morecambe) which won a Fringe First Award at the Edinburgh Festival and won the Laurence Olivier Award for Best Entertainment for its run at the Duchess Theatre in 2009. More recently he participated in an off-Broadway run of The City Club, a blues and boogie-woogie musical that he composed with Tony De Meur and Tim Brown. Compton also worked as composer on six motion pictures (including Dark Streets which was nominated for an Academy Award for Best Original Song), numerous television productions and various electronic media. Michael Caine is to be seen line dancing to Compton's guitar and piano work in the 2013 motion picture Mr. Morgan's Last Love.

In 2005 he started studying for a master's degree in Electronic Arts at Middlesex University, specialising in interactive audio in computer games.

He is now working as a consultant for multimedia applications, websites and games, working to enhance narrative with sound and music.

Discography

Theatre

TV and multimedia

Film

References

External links
 
 
 Compton playing at the 100 Club

British film score composers
British male film score composers
British music arrangers
Alumni of Middlesex University
1959 births
Living people
Musicians from Devon
People from the Borough of West Devon
Microdisney members